Rhodambulyx hainanensis is a species of moth of the family Sphingidae. It is known from the mountains of Hainan Island in China, where it is found at altitudes of about 1,500 meters.

References

Smerinthini
Moths described in 2001